The Gimsøystraumen Bridge is a cantilever road bridge that crosses the Gimsøystraumen strait between the islands of Austvågøya and Gimsøya in Vågan Municipality in Nordland county, Norway.

The bridge has 9 spans. Gimsøystraumen Bridge was opened in 1980. It is one of many bridges that connect the islands of Lofoten to each other as part of the European route E10 highway (also known as Lofast).

See also
List of bridges in Norway
List of bridges in Norway by length
List of bridges
List of bridges by length

References

Vågan
Road bridges in Nordland
Bridges completed in 1981
1981 establishments in Norway
European route E10 in Norway
Roads within the Arctic Circle